John Rowland Martin (5 August 1914 – 1996) was an English footballer who played for Aston Villa.

References 

1914 births
1996 deaths
Footballers from Birmingham, West Midlands
Association football inside forwards
English footballers
Aston Villa F.C. players
English Football League players